Uthamapalayam block is a revenue block in the Theni district of Tamil Nadu, India. It has a total of 13 panchayat villages.

References
 

Revenue blocks of Theni district